Mahler and Carolina Trust Buildings, also known as McLellan's Dime Store and McCrory's Dime Store, are two historic commercial buildings located at Raleigh, North Carolina. The Mahler Building was built in 1876, and the Carolina Trust Building was built in 1902.  They were consolidated as McLellan's Dime Store about 1933.  A two-story annex was added to the building in 1952.  The Mahler Building is a three-story, three bay, Renaissance Revival style brick building with round arched windows. The Carolina Trust Building is a four-story, three bay, Classical Revival style brick building.  The annex is a two-story, seven bay, addition with Art Moderne design elements.

It was listed on the National Register of Historic Places in 2000.  It is located in the Fayetteville Street Historic District.

References 

Commercial buildings on the National Register of Historic Places in North Carolina
Renaissance Revival architecture in North Carolina
Neoclassical architecture in North Carolina
Commercial buildings completed in 1876
Commercial buildings completed in 1902
Buildings and structures in Raleigh, North Carolina
National Register of Historic Places in Raleigh, North Carolina
Historic district contributing properties in North Carolina
1876 establishments in North Carolina